The 2016 Bredeney Ladies Open was a professional tennis tournament played on outdoor clay courts. It was the fourth edition of the tournament and part of the 2016 ITF Women's Circuit, offering a total of $50,000 in prize money. It took place in Essen, Germany, on 6–12 June 2016.

Singles main draw entrants

Seeds 

 1 Rankings as of 23 May 2016.

Other entrants 
The following player received a wildcard into the singles main draw:
  Julia Kimmelmann
  Kristina Kislyak
  Dana Kremer
  Melanie Stokke

The following players received entry from the qualifying draw:
  Akgul Amanmuradova
  Pia König
  Olga Sáez Larra
  Anna Zaja

The following players received entry by lucky loser spots:
  Karen Barritza
  Tayisiya Morderger
  Yana Morderger

Champions

Singles
 
 Sara Sorribes Tormo def.  Karolína Muchová, 7–6(7–5), 6–4

Doubles
 
 Laura Pous Tió /  Anne Schäfer def.  Elyne Boeykens /  Elena Ruse, 6–2, 6–3

External links 
 2016 Bredeney Ladies Open at ITFtennis.com
 Official website 

2016 ITF Women's Circuit
2016 in German tennis
Tennis tournaments in Germany